Allegheny Airlines Flight 853 was a regularly scheduled Allegheny Airlines flight from Boston, Massachusetts, to St. Louis, Missouri, with stops in Baltimore, Maryland, Cincinnati, Ohio, and Indianapolis, Indiana.  On September 9, 1969, the aircraft serving the flight, a McDonnell Douglas DC-9, collided in mid-air with a Piper PA-28 light aircraft near Fairland, Indiana. The DC-9 was carrying 78 passengers and 4 crew members, and the Piper was leased to a student pilot on a solo cross-country flight. All 83 occupants of both aircraft were killed in the accident and both aircraft were destroyed.

Flight history 
Allegheny Airlines Flight 853 was a regularly scheduled flight departing Boston for Baltimore, Cincinnati, Indianapolis, and St. Louis. Captain James Elrod (47) and First Officer William Heckendorn (26) were at the controls. Elrod was a seasoned veteran with more than 23,800 flight hours. The flight left Cincinnati at 3:15 pm en route to Indianapolis. The flight was then vectored to a 280 degree heading.

Meanwhile, the private Piper PA-28 piloted by Robert Carey (34) was on a southeasterly heading. It was not in communication with air traffic control and was not equipped with a transponder, and there was no evidence that it appeared as a primary radar target on the radarscope.

The initial point of impact was at the top front right section of the DC-9's vertical stabilizer, just underneath the horizontal stabilizer. On the Piper, the impact point was just forward of the left wing root.

Probable cause 
The National Transportation Safety Board released the following probable cause in a report adopted July 15, 1970:

The Board determines the probable cause of this accident to be the deficiencies in the collision avoidance capability of the Air Traffic Control system of the FAA in a terminal area wherein there was mixed instrument flight rules (IFR) and visual flight rules (VFR) traffic. The deficiencies included the inadequacy of the see-and-avoid concept under the circumstances of this case; the technical limitations of radar in detecting all aircraft; and the absence of Federal Aviation Regulations which would provide a system of adequate separation of mixed VFR and IFR traffic in terminal areas.

Legacy 
The NTSB and FAA realized the inherent limitations of the "see and be seen" principle of air traffic separation in visual meteorological conditions, especially involving aircraft of dissimilar speeds or cloud layers and other restrictions to visibility. Over a period of years, following similar incidents and taking advantage of technological advances, the two agencies drove a number of corrective steps for the aviation industry, including:
 Transponders are now installed in most general aviation aircraft and all commercial aircraft, dramatically increasing radar visibility of lower and slower-flying smaller aircraft, especially near atmospheric disturbances or other clutter (see Air Traffic Control Radar Beacon System and Secondary Surveillance Radar)
 Most airports with scheduled airline service now have a surrounding controlled airspace (ICAO designation Class B or Class C) for improved IFR and VFR traffic separation; all aircraft must be transponder-equipped and in communication with air traffic control to operate within this controlled airspace
 Most commercial and air-carrier aircraft now have an airborne collision avoidance or TCAS device on board that can detect and warn about nearby transponder-equipped traffic
 ATC radar systems now have "conflict alert"—automated ground-based collision avoidance software that sounds an alarm when aircraft come within a minimum safe separation distance

See also 
 List of notable civilian mid-air collisions
 Aeroméxico Flight 498
 Piedmont Airlines Flight 22
 Pacific Southwest Airlines  Flight 182
TWA Flight 553

References

External links 
 

1969 in Indiana
Allegheny Airlines accidents and incidents
Airliner accidents and incidents in Indiana
Aviation accidents and incidents in the United States in 1969
Accidents and incidents involving the McDonnell Douglas DC-9
Mid-air collisions
Mid-air collisions involving airliners
Shelby County, Indiana
September 1969 events in the United States
Mid-air collisions involving general aviation aircraft